Biagio Proietti (23 June 1940 – 12 March 2022) was an Italian screenwriter, director and writer.

Life and career 
Born in Rome,  graduated in law, Proietti started his career as an assistant director of Francesco Maselli in Time of Indifference. He made a name for himself as a screenwriter of a number of successful television gialli films and series, often directed by Daniele D'Anza and which he often wrote together with his wife Vittoria Prisco. He made his directorial debut with the TV-movie Storia senza parole, and in the 1980s directed two teen comedies. 

Proietti was also a novelist, a radio writer, a playwright and a documentarist. He died on 12 March 2022, at the age of 81.

Selected filmography  
Screenwriter
 Kill Me Quick, I'm Cold, directed by Francesco Maselli (1967)
  (TV, 1970)
 Death Occurred Last Night, directed by Duccio Tessari (1970)
 The Killer Reserved Nine Seats, directed by Giuseppe Bennati (1974)
  (TV, 1976)
 The Black Cat, directed by Lucio Fulci (1981)

Director and screenwriter
 Chewingum (1984)
  (1986)

References

External links  
 

1940 births
2022 deaths
Italian film directors
Italian television directors
Italian male screenwriters
20th-century Italian screenwriters
20th-century Italian male writers
Writers from Rome
Film directors from Rome